USNS Point Loma (T-EPF-15) will be the fifteenth Spearhead-class expeditionary fast transport, operated by the United States Navys Military Sealift Command. On 16 July 2021, acting Secretary of the Navy Thomas Harker announced that she would be named after Point Loma, San Diego. This is the second ship named after Point Loma, with the first being , a Deep Submergence Support Ship 

Point Loma is under construction in Mobile, Alabama by Austal USA.

References 

Transports of the United States Navy
Spearhead-class Joint High Speed Vessels